The 2021 Basildon Borough Council election took place on 6 May 2021 to elect members of Basildon Borough Council in Essex. This was on the same day as other local elections. The Conservative Party regained control of the council from no overall control.

Results summary

Ward results

BCRP = Basildon Community Residents Party

Billericay East

Billericay West

Burstead

Crouch

Fryerns

Laindon Park

Langdon Hills

Lee Chapel North

Nethermayne

Pitsea North West

Pitsea South East

St. Martin's

Vange

Wickford North

By-elections

Pitsea North West

By-election caused by the resignation of incumbent Labour councillor Gavin Callaghan.

Lee Chapel North

References

Basildon
2021
2020s in Essex
May 2021 events in the United Kingdom